Frédéric Paul (born in 1959) is a French curator and writer who works and lives in Vannes and Paris, France.

He was former director of the F.R.A.C. Limousin (Limoges, France) from 1990 to 2000, and of the Domaine de Kerguéhennec from 2000 to 2010. Since he curated exhibitions of Guy de Cointet (2011) and Beatriz Milhazes: Panamericano. Paintings 1999–2012 (2012) at the Fundación Costantini, Buenos Aires and Meu Bem (2013) at the Centro Cultural Paço Imperial, Rio de Janeiro, among others.

Frédéric Paul is currently curator at the National Museum of Modern Art (Musée National d'Art Moderne) at the Centre Georges Pompidou.

Bibliography (selection) 

 "La bibliothèque de l'instituteur, Hubert Duprat, l'archéologie et la macération" (reprint), Hubert Duprat, Les écrits restent, Paris : éditions MF, 2020. 
 Points de rencontres, Paris : Centre Pompidou, 2019. 
 Dorothy Iannone, Toujours de l'audace !, Paris : Manuella éditions, 2019. 
 "William Wegman  : architecte en tous genres", Les Cahiers du Musée national d’art moderne, n° 149, Paris : Centre Georges Pompidou, 2019.
 Barbara Probst  : The Moment in Space, Stuttgart-Paris : Hartmann Books, Le Bal, 2019. 
 "Homme à tout faire et propre à rien, le silence de Robert Walser est surestimé", Robert Walser, Grosse kleine Welt - Petit grand monde, Paris : Beaux-Arts de Paris éditions, 2019. 
 "Un numéro monstre  / From Distraction to Displacement  : The Collages of Beatriz Milhazes", Beatriz Milhazes, Collages,  Rio de Janeiro : Editora Cobogó, 2018.  
 "Monk et Boetti ou l’esprit de famille", Les Cahiers du Musée national d’art moderne, n° 143, éd.  Centre Georges Pompidou, Paris, 2018.
 Steven Pippin / Aberration optique, Paris : éd. Xavier Barral, 2017. 
 Sarah Morris: Capital Letters Rear Better for Initials, Berlin: August Verlag, 2015. 
 Guy de Cointet, Paris: Flammarion, 2014. 
 Giuseppe Penone: Archéologie, Paris: Actes Sud Editions, 2014. 
 Beatriz Milhazes, Meu Bem, Rio de Janeiro: Base7 Projetos Culturais, 2013. 
 Mel Bochner, Bignan: Domaine de Kerguehennec, 2009 
 Shirley Jaffe - I work when I can, preferably in the day time, Bignan: Domaine de Kerguehennec, 2008  
 Richard Artschwager: Step to Entropy, Bignan: Domaine de Kerguehennec, 2004 
 Jonathan Monk, Bignan: Domaine de Kerguehennec, 2003 
 Glenn Brown, 2001, Bignan: Domaine de Kerguehennec, 2003 
 Claude Closky, Paris: Hazan, 1999. 
 William Wegman : dessins/drawings, 1973-1997, Limoges: Frac Limousin, 1997. 
 Le Plus grand espace, Paris: Maeght, 1994.

References

French art critics
Living people
1959 births
French male non-fiction writers
French art curators